The  is the name of a Japanese aerial lift line, as well as its operator. Opened in 1959, the line climbs  in Komono, Mie. Riders can see a view of Yokkaichi and Ise Bay. The mountain itself is known for its scenery and Yunoyama Onsen. The line links to a chairlift line that goes to the summit.

Basic data
System: Bi-cable detachable Gondola lift
Distance: 
Vertical interval: 
Passenger capacity per a cabin: 10
Cabins: 38
Stations: 2

See also

Mount Gozaisho
List of aerial lifts in Japan

External links
 Gozaisho Ropeway Official website

Gondola lifts in Japan
1959 establishments in Japan